Earth from Above is a United Nations-supported ecological project conceived and led by Yann Arthus-Bertrand. The project includes a photo essay-style collection of aerial photography produced by Arthus-Bertrand, in which the photographer captured vistas of Earth from various aircraft during a ten-year period. It gave birth to a book also entitled Earth from Above, of which millions of copies were sold.

Background
Arthus-Bertrand founded the Altitude Agency in 1991, the world's first press agency and image bank specializing in aerial photography. The agency holds 350,000 "selected images" taken in more than a hundred countries. With a history of environmental activism, the photographer sought to exhibit his work at the Rio Conference in 1992, and eventually made a decision to document the condition of planet Earth.

UN sponsorship
In 1994, intent on conveying his perspective on environmental sustainability to other humans, Arthus-Bertrand successfully attained sponsorship from the United Nations Educational, Scientific and Cultural Organization (UNESCO) for the purposes of a long-term photographic project entitled, "The Earth From Above, Wild Animals, Horses, and 365 Days".

Book
Following the Rio summit, Arthus-Bertrand subsequently created a picture inventory of landscapes from across the world with each picture, and accompanying text, encouraging the reader to be responsible in their treatment of the earth. The book from the project, Earth from Above (French: La terre vue du ciel), sold several million copies and was translated into over 21 languages.

Exhibitions
As part of a series of outdoor displays, the "Earth from Above" free exhibition was set up at the gates of Jardin du Luxembourg in Paris, whereby the images appeared as big posters. At the conclusion of the first decade of the 21st century, the series of public exhibitions have been seen by over 200 million people.

Film
In 2007, Earth from Above was launched in a film format, broadcast on French national television as a 4-episode, 8-hour television series. The series, presented by Arthus-Bertrand, has been approved for four seasons (15 episodes) and was created over a four-year timespan.

See also
Environmental art
Home (2009 film)

References

External links
 Yann Arthus-Bertrand's personal website
 Picture Earth
 Altitude Agency
 

2007 films
Films directed by Yann Arthus-Bertrand
Non-narrative films
Photographic collections and books
United Nations mass media